William Forsyth may refer to:

William Forsyth (artist) (1854–1935), American Impressionist painter
William Forsyth (athlete) (1891–1939), Canadian long-distance runner
William Forsyth (barrister) (1812–1899), Scottish lawyer and Member of Parliament
William Forsyth (horticulturist) (1737–1804), Scottish botanist
William Forsyth (merchant) (1722–1800), Scottish merchant
William Forsyth (rugby union) (born 1850), international player who represented Scotland
William Forsyth (writer) (1818–1879), Scottish poet and journalist
William Austin Forsyth, Canadian politician
Will Forsyth (1996–2020), rugby league footballer who played in the 2010s
Bill Forsyth (diplomat) (1909–1993), Australian diplomat
Bill Forsyth (born 1946), Scottish film director and writer

See also
William Forsythe (disambiguation)